Gerd-e Siah may refer to:
 Gerd-e Siah (1)
 Gerd-e Siah (2)